Brod v Podbočju is a small village on the left bank of the Krka River, opposite Podbočje in the  Municipality of Krško in eastern Slovenia. The area is part of the traditional region of Lower Carniola. It is now included with the rest of the municipality in the Lower Sava Statistical Region.

Name
The name of the settlement was changed from Brod to Brod v Podbočju in 1955.

Cultural heritage
A wooden bridge from the early 20th century, made from oak beams, connects the village with the right bank of the river.

References

External links
Brod v Podbočju on Geopedia

Populated places in the Municipality of Krško